"Sly" is a song by British trip hop collective Massive Attack, released as a first single from their second album, Protection (1994), on 17 October 1994. It reached number 24 in the United Kingdom, becoming the band's fourth top-40 single there.

Background
Sly was the combination of Craig Armstrong’s strings combined with Nicolette’s unique sensual vocals. After hearing her first album Now is Early, and being suitably impressed by it, Massive Attack chose Nicolette to appear on the album Protection.

Track listing
US CD single
 "Sly" (7-inch edit)
 "Sly" (7 Stones mix)
 "Sly" (Underdog mix)
 "Sly" (Cosmic dub)
 "Karmacoma" (LP version)

Charts

References

1994 singles
1994 songs
Massive Attack songs
Song recordings produced by Nellee Hooper
Songs written by Andrew Vowles
Songs written by Daddy G
Songs written by Nellee Hooper
Songs written by Robert Del Naja
Virgin Records singles